Yoshito Yahagi(矢作 芳人, Yahagi Yoshito) (born March 20, 1961, in Tokyo, Japan) is a trainer of Thoroughbred race horses. He has been a licensed trainer in Japan since 2004 and since 2014 has won the training title three times.

He has trained Contrail, the 2020 Japanese Triple Crown winner. In the 2021 Breeders' Cup at Del Mar in California, Yahagi trained two winners—Filly & Mare Turf winner Loves Only You and Distaff winner Marche Lorraine. He became the first Japanese trainer to win any Breeders' Cup race.

Major Wins 
Japan

 Asahi Hai Futurity Stakes - (1) - Grand Prix Boss (2010)
 NHK Mile Cup - (1) - Grand Prix Boss (2011)
 Tokyo Yūshun (Japanese Derby) - (2) - Deep Brillante (2012), Contrail (2020)
 Japan Breeding farms' Cup Sprint - (1) - Taisei Legend (2012)
 Yasuda Kinen - (1) - Mozu Ascot (2018)
 Queen Elizabeth II Cup - (1) - Lys Gracieux (2018)
 Yushun Himba (Japanese Oaks) - (1) - Loves Only You (2019)
 Takarazuka kinen - (1) - Lys Gracieux (2019)
 Arima kinen - (1) - Lys Gracieux (2019)
 Hopeful Stakes - (1) - Contrail (2019)
 February Stakes - (1) - Mozu Ascot (2020)
 Satsuki Shō (Japanese 2000 Guineas) - (1) - Contrail (2020)
 Japan Dirt Derby - (1) - Danon Pharaoh (2020)
 Kikuka Shō (Japanese St. Leger) - (1) - Contrail (2020)
 Japan Cup - (1) - Contrail (2021)

UAE

 Dubai Turf - (2) - Real Steel (2016), Panthalassa (2022)

Australia

 Cox Plate - (1) - Lys Gracieux (2019)

Hong Kong

 Queen Elizabeth II Cup - (1) - Loves Only You (2021)
 Hong Kong Cup - (1) - Loves Only You (2021)

United States

 Breeders' Cup Filly & Mare Turf - (1) - Loves Only You (2021)
 Breeders' Cup Distaff - (1) - Marche Lorraine (2021)

Saudi Arabia

 Saudi Cup - (1) - Panthalassa (2023)

References 

1961 births
Living people
Racehorse trainers